Morantel is an anthelmintic drug used for the removal of parasitic worms in livestock. It affects the nervous system of worms given the drug is an inhibitor of acetylcholinesterase. It is derived in part from 3-methylthiophene. Morantel is closely related to pyrantel.

References

Anthelmintics
Veterinary drugs
Thiophenes